The Ultra-Thriller series is a  detective/action fiction series published between August 1992 and June 1993 by Archway Paperbacks (an imprint of Simon & Schuster). It was a spin-off of The Hardy Boys Casefiles and the Tom Swift IV series and joined boy inventor Tom Swift with the crime solving Hardy boys, Frank & Joe. Although The Hardy Boys pseudonym, Franklin W. Dixon was used, this series was more akin to the  Tom Swift IV series by Victor Appleton.

List of titles
Alien Factor
Time Bomb

External links
Tom Swift and His Electronic Web
The Hardy Boys Encyclopedia

The Hardy Boys
Tom Swift
American young adult novels
Juvenile series
Crossover novels
Children's science fiction novels
Children's mystery novels